Ophthalmotilapia ventralis is a species of cichlid endemic to Lake Tanganyika where it is only known from the southern end of the lake.  It can reach a length of  TL.  It can also be found in the aquarium trade.

References

Fauna of Zambia
Ophthalmotilapia
Endemic fauna of Zambia
Fish described in 1898
Taxonomy articles created by Polbot